USS Elfin has been the name of more than one United States Navy ship, and may refer to:

 , a gunboat commissioned in February 1864 and burned in November 1864
 , a patrol boat in commission from 1917 to 1918

See also
 

Elfin